Nature Conservation is a peer-reviewed open access scientific journal covering Conservation Biology. It was established in 2012 by Pensoft Publishers. The editor-in-chief is Klaus Henle.

Abstracting and indexing 
The journal is abstracted and indexed in:
 Science Citation Index Expanded.
 Current Contents/Agriculture, Biology & Environmental Sciences.
 BIOSIS Previews.
According to the Journal Citation Reports, the journal has a 2015 impact factor of 1.120.

References

External links 

 

Publications established in 2012
Creative Commons Attribution-licensed journals
English-language journals
Pensoft Publishers academic journals